The Canton of Les Aspres is a French canton of Pyrénées-Orientales department, in Occitanie. At the French canton reorganisation which came into effect in March 2015, the canton was created including 17 communes from the canton of Thuir, 4 from the canton of Céret and 1 from the canton of Toulouges. Its seat is in Thuir.

Composition 

Banyuls-dels-Aspres
Brouilla
Caixas
Calmeilles
Camélas
Castelnou
Fourques
Llauro
Llupia
Montauriol
Oms
Passa
Pollestres
Ponteilla
Saint-Jean-Lasseille
Sainte-Colombe-de-la-Commanderie
Terrats
Thuir
Tordères
Tresserre
Trouillas
Villemolaque

References

Aspres